Nick Stamulus (born 11 September 1940) is an Australian wrestler. He competed in two events at the 1960 Summer Olympics.

References

External links
 

1940 births
Living people
Australian male sport wrestlers
Olympic wrestlers of Australia
Wrestlers at the 1960 Summer Olympics
Place of birth missing (living people)